European Parliament elections were held in Greece on 26 May 2019 to elect the 21 Greek members of the European Parliament. The elections were held alongside the first round of the local and regional government elections, resulting in a major defeat for the governing Syriza party, and leading to Prime Minister Alexis Tsipras bringing forward the scheduled parliamentary elections for 7 July 2019.

Participating parties
Parties and coalitions participating in the elections:

 Syriza
 Communist Party of Greece (KKE)
 Course of Freedom
 Democracy Left 
 Democratic Responsibility
 Ecologist Greens
 European Realistic Disobedience Front (MeRA25)
 Front of the Greek Anticapitalist Left
 Golden Dawn (XA)
 Greece, the Other Way [el]
 Greek Ecologists
 Greek Solution
 Greens
 Independent Greeks
 Liberal Alliance
 Marxist–Leninist Communist Party of Greece
 Movement for Change (KINAL)
 National Front-Patriotic League-Lions' Movement
 New Democracy (ND)
 New Greek Momentum [el]
 New Right
 Organisation of Internationalist Communists of Greece
 Panhellenic Citizen Chariot
 Party of Friendship, Equality and Peace
 Popular Orthodox Rally-Patriotic Radical Union [el]
 Popular Unity-Pirate Party of Greece
 Rainbow
 Recreate Greece
 The River
 Union of Centrists

Opinion polls

Results

Elected MEPs

New Democracy
Stelios Kympouropoulos (577,114 votes)
Vangelis Meimarakis (496,600 votes)
Maria Spyraki (319,237 votes)
Eliza Vozemberg (288,427 votes)
Manolis Kefalogiannis (257,819 votes)
Anna-Michelle Assimakopoulou (225,211 votes)
Giorgos Kyrtsos (196,929 votes)
Thodoris Zagorakis (195,264 votes)

Coalition of the Radical Left
Dimitrios Papadimoulis (272,835 votes)
Elena Kountoura (236,961 votes)
Kostas Arvanitis (220,816 votes)
Stelios Kouloglou (198,436 votes)
Alexis Georgoulis (162,974 votes)
Petros Kokkalis (140,404 votes)

Movement for Change
Nikos Androulakis (180,822 votes)
Eva Kaili (145,650 votes)

Communist Party of Greece
Kostas Papadakis (55,956 votes)
Eleftherios Nikolaou-Alavanos (34,457 votes)

Golden Dawn
Ioannis Lagos (130,488 votes)
Athanasios Konstantinou (50,360 votes)

Greek Solution
Emmanouil Frangos (27,665 votes)

References

Greece
European Parliament elections in Greece
2019 in Greek politics
Europe